Fort Slocum was one of seven temporary earthwork forts, part of the Civil War Defenses of Washington, D.C., during the Civil War, built in the Northeast quadrant of the city after the beginning of the war by the Union Army to protect the city from the Confederate Army. From west to east, the forts were as follow: Fort Slocum, Fort Totten, Fort Slemmer, Fort Bunker Hill, Fort Saratoga, Fort Thayer and Fort Lincoln.

Civil War

The fort was built by the 2nd Rhode Island Infantry. It was named after Colonel John Slocum of the 2nd Rhode Island Infantry, killed in action on July 21, 1861, at the First Battle of Bull Run (also known as the First Battle of Manassas). The fort perimeter measured  and covered the Rock Creek Church Road (today Blair Road) and New Hampshire Avenue.

The fort contained the following equipment:
 One 8-inch siege howitzer
 Two 24-pounder siege guns
 Two  24-pounder seacoast guns
 Four 24-pounder howitzers
 Seven 4.5-inch siege rifle
 Six 10-pounder rifled Parrott rifles
 One 10-inch siege mortar M. 1841
 Two 24-pounder Coehorn mortars

The batteries were never completed on the east and west of the fort. If they had, an extra ten more guns could have been added.

The following elements garrisoned at the fort at some point during the war:
 76th New York Volunteer Infantry
 1st New Hampshire Heavy Artillery Volunteer Regiment
 150th Ohio National Guard
 14th Independent Battery Michigan Light Artillery
 Pennsylvania Independent Light Artillery Battery E known as "Knapp's Battery"

It provided support to Fort Stevens west of Fort Slocum. When the Confederate States Army attacked Fort Stevens on July 11 and July 12, 1864, Fort Slocum fired its long-range guns. During the battle, 1,500 employees of the Army Quartermaster office led by General Montgomery Meigs assisted the garrison along with 2,800 hospitalized soldiers from the nearby hospitals under the command of Colonel Francis Price.

Post Civil War
Today, no visible evidence remains of Fort Slocum. During World War II, the fort and its surroundings were demolished when victory gardens were planted to support the war effort.

See also

 Civil War Defenses of Washington
 Washington, D.C., in the American Civil War
 Fort Totten
 Fort Slemmer
 Fort Bunker Hill
 Fort Saratoga
 Fort Thayer
 Fort Lincoln
 Battle of Fort Stevens
 Siege artillery in the American Civil War

References

External links
 National Park Service Fort Slocum page

Slocum, Fort
Slocum, Fort
Slocum
American Civil War on the National Register of Historic Places
Parks in Washington, D.C.
Demolished buildings and structures in Washington, D.C.
Washington, D.C., in the American Civil War
1861 establishments in Washington, D.C.